Florentine is a 1937 Austrian comedy film directed by Karel Lamac and starring Paul Hörbiger, Geraldine Katt, Hans Holt and Rudolf Carl.

References

External links

1937 comedy films
1937 films
1930s German-language films
Films directed by Karel Lamač
Austrian black-and-white films
Austrian comedy films